The 2012 summer transfer window for Norwegian football transfers opened on 1 August and closed on 31 August 2012. Additionally, players without a club may join at any time. This list includes transfers featuring at least one Tippeligaen or Adeccoligaen club which are completed after the end of the winter 2011–12 transfer window and before the end of the 2012 summer window.

Tippeligaen

Aalesund

In:

Out:

Brann

In:

Out:

Fredrikstad

In:

Out:

Haugesund

In:

Out:

Hønefoss

In:

Out:

Lillestrøm

In:

Out:

Molde

In:

Out:

Odd Grenland

In:

Out:

Rosenborg

In:

Out:

Sandnes Ulf

In:

Out:

Sogndal

In:

Out:

Stabæk

In:

Out:

Strømsgodset

In:

Out:

Tromsø

In:

Out:

Viking

In:

Out:

Vålerenga

In:

Out:

Adeccoligaen

Bodø/Glimt

In:

Out:

Bryne

In:

Out:

Bærum

In:

Out:

Kongsvinger

In:

Out:

Sandefjord

In:

Out:

Sarpsborg 08

In:

Out:

Start

In:

Out:

Tromsdalen

In:

Out:

References

Transfers Summer
Norway
2012